National Sorry Day, or the National Day of Healing, is an annual event that has been held in Australia on 26 May since 1998. The event remembers and commemorates the mistreatment of the country's Indigenous peoples as part of an ongoing process of reconciliation between the Indigenous peoples of Australia and the settler population.

The first National Sorry Day was held on the one-year anniversary of the 1997 Bringing Them Home report. A key recommendation of the Report was a formal apology to the Stolen Generations. John Howard, who was prime minister at the time, refused to issue an apology, but Kevin Rudd on 13 February 2008 issued a formal apology on behalf of the government and Australian people.

The Report 
The Bringing Them Home report, which was tabled in Australian Parliament, was the result of an inquiry into government policies and practices during the 20th century that caused Aboriginal children to be separated from their families, with the intention of assimilating them into white Australian culture. This resulted in what became known as the "Stolen Generations", with the effects of these traumatic removals being felt by succeeding generations even today. The report made 54 recommendations, including that state and federal governments should issue formal apologies and that funding should be provided to help deal with the consequences of the policies. The report also addressed contemporary separations, noting that Indigenous youth are still removed from their communities – through the justice system, institutions, welfare and adoption system.

Background and history
An older Indigenous protest day is the Day of Mourning, which originated in 1938, focusing on civil rights for Aboriginal people.

On 26 May 1997, Bringing Them Home: Report of the National Inquiry into the Separation of Aboriginal and Torres Strait Islander Children from Their Families was tabled in Parliament.  Among its many recommendations was one that the Prime Minister apologise to the Stolen Generations. Prime Minister John Howard refused to do so, stating that he "did not subscribe to the black armband view of history". The government policy of removing children from their families and placing them in care elsewhere was later described by American sociologist John Torpey as "Aboriginal children separated, often forcibly, from their families in the interest of turning them into white Australians".

On 26 May 1998, the first National Sorry Day was held.

On 26 August 1999, Prime Minister John Howard moved a Motion of Reconciliation, which included an expression of "deep and sincere regret that Indigenous Australians suffered injustices under the practices of past generations, and for the hurt and trauma that many Indigenous people continue to feel as a consequence of those practices". The opposition leader, Kim Beazley, moved to replace John Howard's motion of regret with an unreserved apology which was not successful.

The annual commemorations are intended to raise awareness among politicians, policy makers, and the wider public about the forcible removal policies and their impact on the children who were taken, their families and their communities.

On 28 May 2000, more than 250,000 people, both Indigenous and non-Indigenous Australians, participated in a walk across Sydney Harbour Bridge, organised by the Council for Aboriginal Reconciliation to protest the lack of a government apology to Indigenous people, show solidarity and to raise public awareness of the issue.

In 2005, the National Sorry Day Committee renamed the day as the National Day of Healing, with the motion tabled in Parliament by Senator Aden Ridgeway. In his words, "the day will focus on the healing needed throughout Australian society if we are to achieve reconciliation".

On 13 February 2008, then Prime Minister Kevin Rudd moved a motion of Apology to Indigenous Australians. His apology was a formal apology on behalf of the successive parliaments and governments whose policies and laws "inflicted profound grief, suffering and loss on these our fellow Australians". The apology was the new parliament's first order of business; Rudd became the first Australian Prime Minister to publicly apologise to the Stolen Generations on behalf of the Australian federal government. The apology was passed unanimously as a motion by both houses of parliament, as thousands of people gathered to hear the apology both in the Great Hall and outside Parliament House in Canberra and in large gatherings across the country, in schools, offices and public squares. Crying, cheering and clapping followed.

Close the Gap and Closing the Gap

Close the Gap (CTG) is a social justice campaign focused on Indigenous health, in which "Australia's peak Indigenous and non-Indigenous health bodies, NGOs and human rights organisations are working together to achieve equality in health", whose Steering Committee first met in March 2006. Their campaign was launched in April 2007 by patrons Catherine Freeman OAM and Ian Thorpe OAM, launched the Campaign.

The Australian government under Prime Minister Kevin Rudd adopted its goals in 2008, in a strategy known as Closing the Gap. and in 2009 committed to making an annual progress report to Parliament on progress with the Closing the Gap strategy.

National Close the Gap Day (NCTGD) was run by Oxfam Australia for 10 years from 2009, mobilising hundreds of thousands of people across the country in support of Indigenous health equality. In January 2019, ANTaR (Australians for Native Title and Reconciliation) took over the reins.

 Close the Gap has produced 11 reports, including a 10-year review in 2018.

See also 
 Day of Mourning (Australia), 26 January 1938
 Harmony Day
 Mabo Day
 NAIDOC Week
 National Reconciliation Week
 Reconciliation Australia
 Reconciliation in Australia
 1967 Australian referendum (Aboriginals)

Other countries
 I Apologize campaign, a grassroots initiative in Turkey
 Native American Day

References

External links
Sorry Day and the Stolen Generations
Stolen Generations Alliance
Stolen Generations Testimonies Project
The Aboriginal and Torres Strait Islander Healing Foundation 
Reconciliation Australia
Kimberley Stolen Generation Aboriginal Corporation
The National Apology – Snapshots of relevant webpages from 2008

Civil awareness days
May observances
Recurring events established in 1998
Stolen Generations
Genocide remembrance days